Plagiotelum is a genus of beetles in the family Carabidae, containing the following species:

 Plagiotelum irinum Solier
 Plagiotelum opalescens Olliff, 1885

References

Ctenodactylinae